Ilona Madary (23 June 1916 – 11 June 2003) was a Hungarian gymnast who competed in the 1936 Summer Olympics.

References

1916 births
2003 deaths
Hungarian female artistic gymnasts
Olympic gymnasts of Hungary
Gymnasts at the 1936 Summer Olympics
Olympic bronze medalists for Hungary
Olympic medalists in gymnastics
Medalists at the 1936 Summer Olympics
20th-century Hungarian women
21st-century Hungarian women